Hyperaspis quadrivittata, also known as the four-streaked lady beetle, is a small beetle (2.0-2.7mm) found in North America west of the 100th meridian. It is a species of lady beetle in the family Coccinellidae.

References

Further reading

 

Coccinellidae
Articles created by Qbugbot
Beetles described in 1852